Jesse Carlsson is an Australian BMX age-group world champion, theoretical physics PhD, ultra-distance cycling competitor and businessman.

Ultra-distance racing

Tour Divide
Carlsson placed second in the 2013 Tour Divide.

Trans Am Bike Race
In 2015, Carlsson won the Trans Am Bike Race, a 4,250 mile race across the United States in a time less than 19 days, more than 35 hours ahead of the next finishers.

Race to the Rock
In 2016, Carlsson designed and promoted an ultra-endurance race from Adelaide, Australia to Uluru, called the Race to the Rock. Although Carlsson, as a competitor in the first edition of the race took an early lead, he was forced to retire when he broke his wrist.

Indian Pacific Wheel Race
In 2017, Carlsson designed the Indian Pacific Wheel Race, a 5,500 kilometer road race across the continent of Australia. In the course of the first race, Mike Hall was killed by a motorist. Carlsson was a competitor in the event, but had to withdraw due to injury. Due to the tragic death of Hall, the event was cancelled in progress. In 2018, Carlsson organized a second edition of the race, before cancelling it due to legal issues from the tragedy. In the end, many riders came and rode as a tribute to Hall, without an official race being held.

Business
Carlsson is a director of Curve Cycling.

References

Living people
Australian male cyclists
Ultra-distance cyclists
Year of birth missing (living people)
Australian physicists
Cyclists from Melbourne
BMX riders
Australian businesspeople